The 2014 Texas gubernatorial election was held on November 4, 2014, to elect the governor of Texas. Incumbent Republican Governor Rick Perry, who had served since the resignation of then-Governor George W. Bush on December 21, 2000, declined to run for an unprecedented fourth full term, making this the first open election for governor of the state since 1990.

The election took place between nominees who were selected on March 4, 2014: Republican State Attorney General Greg Abbott and Democratic State Senator Wendy Davis. Also on the ballot were Libertarian Party candidate Kathie Glass and Green Party candidate Brandon Parmer. Abbott was projected to carry the election, and ultimately won handily with a 20.4 percentage point advantage.  Exit polls showed Abbott winning Whites (72% to 25%), while Davis received majorities among African Americans (92% to 7%) and Hispanics (55% to 44%). Abbott won roughly half of Hispanic men, 54% of all women, and 62% of married women.

Abbott took office on January 20, 2015, as the 48th Governor of Texas.

Republican primary

Candidates

Declared
 Greg Abbott, Attorney General of Texas
 Lisa Fritsch, author and radio show host
Larry Kilgore, perennial candidate
 Miriam Martinez, former Univision personality

Withdrew
 Tom Pauken, former Texas Workforce Commissioner and former chairman of the Republican Party of Texas

Declined
 David Dewhurst, Lieutenant Governor of Texas (ran for re-election and lost the party primary runoff)
 Debra Medina, activist and candidate for Governor of Texas in 2010 (running for Texas Comptroller of Public Accounts)
 Rick Perry, incumbent Governor of Texas

Endorsements

Polling

Results

Democratic primary

Candidates

Declared
 Wendy Davis, state senator
 Ray Madrigal, perennial candidate

Declined
 Julian Castro, United States Secretary of Housing and Urban Development and former mayor of San Antonio
 Kinky Friedman, singer, songwriter, novelist, humorist and independent candidate for governor in 2006 (candidate in May 27 runoff for Texas Commissioner of Agriculture)
 Annise Parker, Mayor of Houston
 Mike Villarreal, state representative
 Kirk Watson, state senator and former mayor of Austin
 Bill White, former Mayor of Houston and nominee for governor in 2010

Endorsements

Polling

Results

Libertarian nomination

Candidates

Declared
 Robert Bell, pharmaceutical executive and chemist
 Robert Garrett, veteran, helicopter mechanic and prison officer
 Kathie Glass, attorney
 Robert "Star" Locke, rancher, building contractor, veteran and perennial candidate

Withdrew
 Gene Chapman, candidate for President of the United States in 2008
 R. Lee Wrights, Vice Chair of the Libertarian National Committee and candidate for President of the United States in 2012

Results
Kathie Glass was nominated at the 2014 party convention.

Green nomination

Candidates

Declared
 Brandon Parmer, candidate for Texas's 6th congressional district in 2012

Independents

Candidates

Declared
 Sarah M. Pavitt, an Army veteran and cousin of former SOCOM commander William H. McRaven, ran as a write-in candidate.

Declined
 Debra Medina, activist and Republican candidate for governor in 2010 (ran unsuccessfully for Texas Comptroller of Public Accounts)

General election

Debates
The first of two confirmed gubernatorial debates between Wendy Davis and Greg Abbott took place at the Edinburg Conference Center at Renaissance at 18:00 on Friday, September 19, co-hosted by KGBT-TV, The Monitor and KTLM-TV. KGBT-TV posted the complete video online and can be viewed here. The debate took place in Edinburg, Texas, and it gave both candidates an opportunity to appeal to the Hispanic community, a grouping seen by Reuters as an "increasingly important voting bloc in Texas." The second debate took place on September 30 and was also posted online.

Predictions

Polling

With Castro

 With Davis

With Parker

With White

 * Poll for the Wendy Davis campaign
 ^ Poll for the Greg Abbott campaign

Results

See also
 2014 United States gubernatorial elections
 2014 United States House of Representatives elections in Texas
 2014 United States Senate election in Texas
 2014 Texas elections

References

External links
 Texas gubernatorial election, 2014 at Ballotpedia
 Greg Abbott for Governor
 Wendy Davis for Governor
 Kathie Glass for Governor
 Lisa Fritsch for Governor
 Larry Kilgore for Governor
 Miriam Martinez for Governor
 R. Lee Wrights for Governor
 Gene Chapman for Governor

2014 Texas elections
2014
2014 United States gubernatorial elections